Hanover Township is a township in Lehigh County, Pennsylvania. As of the 2010 census, the township had a population of 1,571. It is a suburb of Allentown and Bethlehem and part of the Lehigh Valley metropolitan area, which had a population of 861,899 and was the 68th most populous metropolitan area in the U.S. as of the 2020 census.

Hanover Township is home of Lehigh Valley International Airport, the fourth largest airport in Pennsylvania, with 851,000 passengers annually as of 2020.

Geography
The Lehigh River drains it and separates it from Whitehall Township.

Neighboring municipalities
Bethlehem (east)
Allentown (south)
Whitehall Township (west)
Catasauqua (west)
Allen Township, Northampton County (north)
East Allen Township, Northampton County (north-northeast)
Hanover Township, Northampton County (northeast)

Transportation

Roads and highways

U.S. Route 22 crosses the township east-to-west and interchanges in the township with Airport Road, which extends northeast toward Bath as Pennsylvania Route 987 and south into Allentown. Other local roads of note include Catasauqua Road, Dauphin Street, Irving Street, Pennsylvania Avenue, Postal Road, Race Street, and Schoenersville Road (pronounced "SHAY-nerz-vil.") The latter two roads intersect Route 987 in the village of Schoenersville on the border with Northampton County.

Lehigh Valley International Airport
Lehigh Valley International Airport is located in Hanover Township. It is the fourth most heavily trafficked airport in Pennsylvania with 851,000 passengers annually as of 2020.

Climate
The township has a hot-summer humid continental climate (Dfa) and the hardiness zone is 6b.

Demographics

As of the census of 2000, there were 1,913 people, 892 households, and 498 families residing in the township.  The population density was 454.6 people per square mile (175.4/km).  There were 937 housing units at an average density of 222.7 per square mile (85.9/km).  The racial makeup of the township was 86.15% White, 5.54% African American, 0.05% Native American, 4.70% Asian, 1.99% from other races, and 1.57% from two or more races. Hispanic or Latino of any race were 6.12% of the population.

There were 892 households, out of which 20.6% had children under the age of 18 living with them, 41.1% were married couples living together, 11.3% had a female householder with no husband present, and 44.1% were non-families. 34.1% of all households were made up of individuals, and 8.9% had someone living alone who was 65 years of age or older.  The average household size was 2.14 and the average family size was 2.77.

In the township, the population was spread out, with 18.3% under the age of 18, 8.7% from 18 to 24, 32.9% from 25 to 44, 26.2% from 45 to 64, and 13.8% who were 65 years of age or older.  The median age was 38 years. For every 100 females, there were 96.4 males.  For every 100 females age 18 and over, there were 93.8 males. The median income for a household in the township was $35,061, and the median income for a family was $41,680. Males had a median income of $31,848 versus $27,014 for females. The per capita income for the township was $20,265.  About 4.0% of families and 5.6% of the population were below the poverty line, including 6.3% of those under age 18 and 8.5% of those age 65 or over.

Public education
The township is served by the Catasauqua Area School District. High school students in grades nine through 12 attend Catasauqua High School in Northampton.

Notes

References

External links

Townships in Lehigh County, Pennsylvania
Townships in Pennsylvania